K/DA is a virtual K-pop girl group consisting of four themed versions of League of Legends characters Ahri, Akali, Evelynn and Kai'Sa. (G)I-dle members Miyeon and Soyeon provide the voices of Ahri and Akali. Madison Beer and Grammy award-winning singer Kim Petras voice Evelynn. Jaira Burns provided the voice for Kai'Sa. However, the characters have also been voiced by other artists.

K/DA was developed by Riot Games, the company behind League of Legends, and was unveiled at the 2018 League of Legends World Championship with an augmented reality live performance of their debut single, "Pop/Stars". A music video of the song uploaded to YouTube subsequently went viral, surpassing 100 million views in one month, reaching 525 million views as of August 2022, and topping Billboards World Digital Song Sales chart. In 2020, K/DA released their debut five-track EP All Out, which includes the pre-release single "The Baddest" and the lead single "More". In 2022, "Pop/Stars" was certified platinum by the Recording Industry Association of America (RIAA), making K/DA and (G)I-dle the first K-pop girl groups in history to achieve this milestone.

The conception of K/DA was based on Riot's expressed desire to create more musical content, with the characters chosen based on K-pop archetypes. The group was created to promote the League World Championship and to sell in-game K/DA skins of the characters in League of Legends. K/DA has subsequently achieved significant popularity both within and beyond the League of Legends fandom and received critical acclaim, particularly for their performance during the World Championship and the impact of gaming on the music scene.

Appearances 

K/DA was unveiled in the 2018 League of Legends World Championship Opening Ceremony in Incheon on November 3, 2018, with the release of their debut single "Pop/Stars". It is a bilingual song with both K-pop and American pop influences, with vocals in English by Beer and Burns, and in both English and Korean by Soyeon and Miyeon. During the ceremony, Beer, Burns, Miyeon and Soyeon performed "Pop/Stars" on-stage, whilst augmented reality versions of the characters they voiced sang and danced alongside them. The augmented reality versions of the characters could perform acts a human could not achieve, such as Ahri flying onto the stage, whilst a human singer has "a certain raw human element" that can't yet be captured by a virtual performer.

Viranda Tantula, the creative lead on the project, wrote that "we went into this really wanting to make [the ceremony] a dope 'League' moment for players – albeit one where the fantasy of the champs being in the real world played out in an authentic manner that could live alongside others in their verticals (i.e. song had to be able to stand up to other pop songs, performance had to stand up to other performances, etc.)." The official music video for the song was released on YouTube on the same day.

According to Sebastien Najand, who composed "Pop/Stars", an all-English demo was trialled at first, followed by a version with significantly more Korean. Ultimately, Najand said that "we wanted to make it a blend of western pop and K-Pop". Patrick Morales, the creative lead behind the "Pop/Stars" music video, said that he wanted K/DA to exist "somewhere between fantasy and reality". The team was initially uncertain of the type of music that would be most suitable for the group, due to amount of variety within the pop music genre. They eventually decided against a cuter, more-idol group based theme in favour of something "modern and edgy" that combines a "bit of street style with a handcrafted feel."

In League of Legends 
K/DA skins of Ahri, Akali, Evelynn and Kai'Sa, depicting the characters as how they appear in the band, are available for purchase in League of Legends. Skins in the game are for cosmetic purposes only, and the K/DA skins cost 1350 RP (RP is the League of Legends in-game currency) which costs around US$10 to purchase. The Prestige skins were available by completing special missions in-game, but can now only be acquired through skin rerolls or purchased with mythic essence when they are "unvaulted". The popularity of K/DA in 2018 led Riot to release an EP consisting of five songs, new skins inspired on its artwork, and music videos in 2020.

Other appearances 
Similar to League of Legends, K/DA appear in the spin-off game Wild Rift as skins. It is also noticeable that the game receive the champions into the game the same day when the All Out skins come out in October 2020.

In Legends of Runeterra, K/DA All Out was released as special board that can play 3 of their songs. Also, each member and Seraphine also appear as unique cards in the card game.

In Teamfight Tactics, K/DA members were the insipration for the Little Legends, skins for the controllable avatar in the game.

Three K/DA songs are featured on Ubisoft's Just Dance series. "Drum Go Dum" is featured in Just Dance 2021 as a free limited-time gift, and was later released to the Unlimited subscription service. The in-game routine uses some moves from the official choreography by Bailey Sok, performed by coaches resembling the K/DA members in their All Out outfits. For Just Dance 2022, "Pop/Stars" is featured in the main tracklist, with the coaches bearing the outfits from the original music video. "More" is featured in Just Dance 2023 Edition with two different routines, one with the coaches in their All Out outfits and the other with a coach resembling Seraphine in her bedroom backdrop from the original music video.

Conception and creation 
The name "K/DA" is an in-game term in League of Legends that refers to a player's kills, deaths, and assists. The creation of K/DA was based in part on the desire of Riot Games, Leagues developers to "see their company more as a full-fledged music label in the future". Toa Dunn, head of Riot's music division, claimed in an interview with Variety that "[K/DA] was the most involved music project we've ever done".

According to Tantula, "We believe there's a huge overlap between League of Legends, esports overall and the music industry", and as a result, they invested "in building [their] internal music team with both an artist focused creative studio full of composers, songwriters and producers, as well as people who can perform all the services that you would see at a standard music label, such as distribution, A&R and promo." Patrick Morales (creative lead behind the "Pop/Stars" music video), Janelle Jimenez (the lead designer behind the K/DA skins) and Toa Dunn (the head of the Riot Music Group) were the main creators of K/DA. The dances were choreographed by Ellen Kim, Bailey Sok, Stevie Doré and Eileen Harman. 4Minute also served as a source of inspiration behind K/DA. For singing "Pop/Stars", Madison Beer was brought on early, and Jaira Burns followed. As many at Riot were fans of (G)I-dle and liked "the attitude they brought to the song, especially the rap section", Miyeon and Soyeon were brought on as well.

Members 
The members of K/DA consist of four characters from the League of Legends video game:

 Ahri (voiced by Laura Post, singing voices provided by Miyeon, Nayeon, Sana, Jihyo, Chaeyoung, Bekuh Boom, and Annika Wells) is a nine-tailed fox mage in League of Legends, and one of the most popular characters in League of Legends. In lore she is a Vastaya, a chimeric race of humainoid beast creatures, in Ahri's case a fox-type of Vastaya known as Vesani. In-game, she is a mage-assassin hybrid usually played in the mid lane. Her main weapon is her orb of deception, which she can command to damage enemies and then return to her. She can also heal herself by hurting others, launch 'foxfire' missiles towards her enemies, charm enemies to immobilize them and use her ultimate ability 'Spirit Rush'; to rapidly dash up to three times. In K/DA, Ahri serves as the leader and founder of K/DA, as well as one of the main vocalists along with Evelynn. Her All Out solo song is "I'll Show You". According to Miyeon, she started learning more about League of Legends and actually played the game as Ahri to better understand her character. Miyeon was invited to visit Riot Headquarters in 2020 along with Soyeon to play League of Legends as their represented characters and skins (Soyeon as K/DA Akali, Miyeon as K/DA Ahri). Ahri also appears as a playable character in Ruined King: A League of Legends Story.
 Akali (voiced by Laura Bailey and Krizia Bajos in League of Legends, voiced in K/DA interviews and promotional videos by Shannon Williams, singing voice provided by Soyeon) is a Ninja assassin character usually played in either the mid lane or top lane. In lore, Akali hails from Ionia formerly as a part of the Kinkou Order under its grandmaster Shen. After witnessing the atrocities committed by Noxus and the Kinkou's restrained response to the invasion of Ionia led to her abandoning the Order to defend her homeland in a direct fashion, becoming a rogue ninja. In game, her abilities involve creating clouds of smoke to become invisible, as well as throwing shurikens at opponents while hitting them with a kama and kunai. She is very mobile with abilities that allow her to dash rapidly and execute enemies with her ultimate. Her All Out solo song is "The Baddest". In K/DA, Akali is the main rapper of the group. Soyeon said she tried to "feel like Akali and move as if I were Akali" during the motion capture for "Pop/Stars".  Akali is also a member of True Damage, another virtual group formed by League of Legends characters. Soyeon also played the game on two separate occasions; first alone on a livestream, and then a few months later with Miyeon at Riot Headquarters in 2020 as their represented characters and skins (Soyeon as K/DA Akali, Miyeon as K/DA Ahri). 
 Evelynn (voiced by Mara Junot, singing voices provided by Madison Beer, Bea Miller and Kim Petras) is a sadistic Demon assassin usually played in the jungle. In lore, she is a primordial demon who takes on forms that attracts her victims. At the height of her target's pleasure, she unleashes her true form and preys on their suffering as a result. In game, her noteworthy ability involves her being permanently invisible to enemies (shadow form) when outside of combat or outside of a vision range. This allows her to sneak up on enemies and appear from her shadow-form, using her charm spell to immobilize them, followed by quickly eliminating them with her combo and execution-like ultimate spell. In K/DA, Evelynn serves as one of the main vocalists along with Ahri. Her All Out solo song is "Villain". Some facts about Evelynn in the K/DA universe: She is known for her uncompromising vision, rich vocals, and "bad girl" attitude. Before K/DA, she had disagreements in other musical groups before working alone to write her own music before reconnecting with Ahri to create K/DA. Evelynn is very mysterious about her diet and workouts and usually declines to comment on her routine. She has a collection of very fast cars.  She is close to few people and very protective of them. She has been romantically linked with several missing male celebrities but never confirmed a relationship. Evelynn has stated she takes inspiration from Karthus (another playable character in League of Legends who stars in the music group Pentakill).
 Kai'Sa (voiced by Natasha Loring, singing voices provided by Jaira Burns, Wolftyla, Aluna Francis and Bekuh Boom) is a burst marksman and usually played in the bottom lane. In lore, Kai'Sa is the daughter of another champion, Kassadin, who was lost to the Void, an alternate plane of existence connected to Runeterra filled with many unspeakable horrors amidst the utter nothingness and darkness. To survive, she merged with a Voidborn, a creature of the Void, becoming an apex predator herself and has since returned to Runeterra not fully Voidborn, but remarkably less human. In game, Kai'sa can either snipe enemies from afar or dash close to them and fire missiles from magical cannons floating above her shoulders. She also has an ability to dodge attacks, which can also grant her invisibility once she is powerful enough. In K/DA, Kai'Sa is the main dancer of the group. She also rapped in "The Baddest" and sang in "Pop/Stars", "More", and her All Out solo song, "Drum Go Dum".

About the characters 

The characters were chosen from League of Legends character list based on whether players would realistically see them as "popstars". According to Patrick Morales, Ahri was the first character to be chosen for K/DA, due to her previous appearances in League of Legends-related music as "Pop Star Ahri" back in 2013. Subsequently, with Ahri being a "beautiful, charming leader"-type character, Evelynn was chosen to contrast to that, by "being the wild and provocative diva of the group". As Akali's character was being reworked at the time, Morales included her into the band as he liked the "rebellious spirit" of the character. Kai'Sa was included due to a recommendation from skins lead Janelle Jimenez, as she wanted a "strong but silent loner who expressed herself on stage through her movements".

The team also wanted diversity in the characters chosen, where each character has a well-defined archetype that allows viewers to easily identify their favourite K/DA member. According to Jimenez, "Pop groups tend to have a formula where each member has their own unique personality and style. I approached this like looking at classic anime team where you have the leader, the shy one, the feisty one, etc." Furthermore, they also wanted to ensure that the characters chosen had differing roles in the game. "Pop/Stars" was written with these archetypes in mind. For example, a rap section was included in the song as Akali was envisioned to be the rapper, and the pre-chorus was designed to be sung by Ahri.

K/DA has achieved significant popularity both within and beyond the League of Legends community. Writing for Dot Esports, Aaron Mickunas noted that "It didn't take long for K/DA [...] to completely flood the game's fan community. The group's members have been promoted throughout Reddit, Twitter, the game's forums, and Universe, League of Legends' lore platform." "Pop/Stars" reached number 1 on Billboards World Digital Song Sales chart in November 2018, making K/DA the fourth K-pop girl group to do so, and only the fifth female act overall, leading Jeff Benjamin of Billboard to write that "all signs point to Esports very possibly shaping what can make a hit song in the future." The song sold 9,000 copies in its opening week, according to Nielsen Music. It also ranked 10th on the Pop Digital Song Sales chart and 30th on Digital Song Sales overall, as well as charting first on Apple Music's K-Pop charts and fifth for pop music overall.

The "Pop/Stars" music video received 5 million views within 24 hours of its upload to YouTube, breaking the record at the time for the most viewed K-Pop debut group music video within 24 hours of publishing, a record previously held by "La Vie en Rose" by South Korean-Japanese girl group Iz*One. The video continued to garner views, receiving over 13 million views within 48 hours, when the video trended on the site. On April 2, 2019, the music video reached 200 million views. Benjamin Pu of NBC News wrote that "The song's popularity highlights just how much of a cultural force video games have become in South Korea and around the world."

K/DA's popularity has resulted in a large amount of fanart being created of the group. This includes a large amount of art featuring Akali and Evelynn, as the two were paired up in the "Pop/Stars" music video, with Akali being the most popular. Cosplay of the characters has also been popular, including when Cloud9's League of Legends esports team cosplayed as the K/DA characters in April 2019. Professional League player Sneaky also cosplayed as K/DA Kai'Sa, and after he posted images of the cosplay on Twitter, the tweets received over 4,500 retweets and 23,700 likes within two days. Shannon Liao of The Verge wrote that through K/DA, "Riot Games has tapped into an audience bigger than the typical League fan base", with ex-players and new players joining the game "because the [Pop/Stars] video looks so cool." Riot's Patrick Morales agreed, noting K/DA's impact goes beyond just that of League fandom, with "one recurring comment that I tend to see on YouTube and social media about the music video is that they're "normally not into League/K-pop/gaming, but K/DA is the exception".

Steven Asarch of Newsweek compared K/DA to the K-pop girl group Blackpink. Lucas Lockyer of Dazed called K/DA a mix of "Girls Generation meets Little Mix and Hatsune Miku" and asked if the band was "leading the virtual pop future", where "what was essentially some creative promotional marketing could be the forefront of an interesting new branch of pop [...] Perhaps with developed AR technology, the characters could tour in hologram form without the physical appearance of the singers behind them." When asked about whether this would be possible with a holographic concert or augmented reality technology Viranda Tantula replied that "that could be super fun. But before we'd even consider that, we'd realistically want to make sure there was enough quality music to support it, and a good reason for us, a games company and esports league, to try that out." "Pop/Stars" was also added as a song to the virtual reality rhythm game Beat Saber as a free download.

Guest feature 
 Seraphine (voiced by Michele Panu, singing voices provided by Lexie Liu and Jasmine Clarke) is a champion in League of Legends who can either be played in the mid lane as a burst mage or in the bottom lane as an enchantress support (alongside a marksman, such as Kai'sa). Her entire character and abilities are based around music. In the League of Legends universe, she is a singing superstar in the city of Piltover, with her floating stage that is powered by a crystal. In the K/DA universe, she is a Chinese-American living in Los Angeles, and sings in both English and Chinese. After her singing on social media gained the attention of the K/DA members, she had a collaboration on K/DA's 2020 title track "More", and helped produce K/DA's first extended play, All Out. Seraphine is not a permanent member of K/DA, and it is unknown if she will appear again in the K/DA universe. In the real world, she has an Instagram and a Twitter account that details her start as an indie artist to becoming a pop star. She also has a SoundCloud containing several covers posted in late 2020, consisting of "Childhood Dreams" by ARY, "Pop/Stars" by K/DA, and "All the Things She Said" by Russian duo T.A.T.u. Along with her covers, she has also released her own song "Made Me This Way".

Discography

Extended plays

Singles

Other charted songs

Awards and nominations

Notes

References 

League of Legends
Animated musical groups
Bands with fictional stage personas
Fictional female musicians
K-pop music groups
Musical groups established in 2018
Jeon So-yeon
2018 establishments in the United States
2018 establishments in South Korea
Musical quartets
Fictional characters invented for recorded music
Virtual influencers